Merfolk or merpeople are legendary water-dwelling human-like beings.

Merfolk may also refer:

 Mermaid or mergirl, a female merperson
 Merman or merboy, a male merperson